The caudal ramus (plural: caudal rami) is a characteristic feature of primitive crustaceans. Located on the anal somite (telson segment), the caudal ramus is a pair of appendage-like or spine-like protrusions. Specific structures which are rod or blade-like are referred to as caudal furca.

References
Brusca, Gary J. & Richard C. Brusca, Invertebrates. 2003.

Crustacean anatomy